Afrocelyphus is a genus of Chloropidae, the genus was originally placed in the family Celyphidae.

Species
Afrocelyphus saegeri Malloch, 1929

References

Chloropidae genera
Diptera of Africa